The 1995–96 Austrian Hockey League season was the 66th season of the Austrian Hockey League, the top level of ice hockey in Austria. Eight teams participated in the league, and VEU Feldkirch won the championship.

Regular season

Playoffs

Quarterfinals

Semifinals

Final

External links
Austrian Ice Hockey Association

Aus
1995–96 in Austrian ice hockey leagues
Austrian Hockey League seasons